Helen Foster may refer to:

 Helen Foster (politician), New York City Council member 
 Helen Foster (actress) (1906–1982), American film actress
 Helen Foster Snow (1907–1997), born as Helen Foster, American journalist